Garand is a French surname. It is most commonly used in reference to the as M1 Garand rifle

It may also refer to the Garand carbine, a .30 caliber carbine designed by John Garand in 1941

Persons named Garand
 Dylan Garand (born 2002), Canadian ice hockey player
 John Cantius Garand (January 1, 1888 – February 16, 1974), Canadian-American engineer who created the eponymous M1 Garand rifle
 Pierre Garand, stage name Garou (born 26 June 1972), Canadian singer

Places
 Garand Kalan, a village in India

French-language surnames